Global Force Wrestling has held a variety of professional wrestling tournaments competed for by wrestlers that are a part of their roster.

Sporadic tournaments
The GFW Championship Tournaments took place between July 25–October 23, 2015.

GFW NEX*GEN Championship Tournament (2015)

GFW Tag Team Championship Tournament (2015)

GFW Women's Championship Tournament (2015)

GFW Global Championship Tournament (2015)

GFW Tag Team Championship Tournament (2017)
After The Bollywood Boyz vacated the titles to join the WWE there was a tournament to crown new GFW Tag Team Champions. The tournament took place within Impact Wrestling.

References

External links 

Global Force Wrestling
Professional wrestling tournaments
Professional wrestling-related lists